Uncovered/Covered is a collaborative studio album by American singers and then-real-life couple Kenny Lattimore and Chanté Moore. It was released by LaFace Records and Verity through Sony BMG on October 10, 2006 in the United States. Formatted as a double album, the two-disc set consists of Uncovered, a disc of R&B songs, and Covered, a disc of gospel songs that were primarily produced by Fred Hammond. Uncovered/Covered received a Stellar Award nomination for Best Contemporary Group/Duo of the Year.

Background 
Originally the album was recorded as a single disc titled Uncovered and scheduled for release in November 2005. The title was chosen as a double entendre representing the "uncovered truth behind the ups and downs in a marriage," as well as denoting a departure from their previous release which was a cover album. In keeping with the album theme of love established on their previous abum Things That Lovers Do (2003), the bulk of Uncovered/Covered addresses the subject from to aspects, with the first disc examining the romantic aspect of love.

The second disc addresses its spiritual aspect. At the time of the release of lead single "Tonight," Lattimore and Moore's follow-up was planned to be a single disc follow-up simply titled Uncovered. Verity Records president Max Siegel requested that they record a gospel component to the disc after a standout performance at the Stellar Awards in 2006. Though both singers were primarily known for their contributions to R&B music by then, the couple found that they were "no strangers to the gospel genre." Prior to releasing his debut album, Lattimore was a featured vocalist on gospel artist William Becton's album Broken. As for Moore, she enlisted BeBe Winans to produce the gospel song "Because You're Mine" on her 1992 debut Precious. Save for a single track, the second disc, which would be titled Covered, was produced by gospel hitmaker Fred Hammond.

Singles 
The first original song released to the public was the uptempo single "Tonight (2-Step)" which playfully incorporates into the chorus a bit of the 1965 Bacharach/David anthem "What the World Needs Now Is Love." Closer to the release of the double album, the song "Figure It Out" was written and recorded with producer Bryan-Michael Cox, added to the album and released as a single. "Figure It Out" reached number 24 on the Bubbling Under R&B/Hip-Hop Singles chart, and number 37 on the Adult R&B Songs.

Critical reception 

Andy Kellman of Allmusic expressed that Lattimore and Moore "keep it elegant and romantic the whole time". He praised their performances, writing "Lattimore sounds as good as ever through the whole program, but his long-under-recognized wife shines so well, ably approaching nearly every song at a different angle, that he's pretty much outclassed." Natasha Washington for News OK, similarly expressed that "at times, Moore outshines Lattimore in song, but each track's message is heartfelt." Chris Rizik from SoulTracks heralded the album as "a real triumph – a disc that captures their intelligent, thoughtful thesis of love and marriage and combines it with a level of sincere spirituality, all wrapped in a beautiful, creative musical tapestry' before noting 'it is flat out one of the best adult soul albums you'll hear this year."

Andree Farias of crosswalk.com found that "the Uncovered disc is the romantic portion, a breezy affair full of smooth R&B numbers; Covered, on the other hand, covers the spiritual spectrum to a more urbanized contemporary gospel style." She noted that "neither disc is all that didactic or revealing in their fields, offering instead tried-and-true generalities about what it means to love God and love each other, but they're nonetheless heartfelt." News OK editor Natasha Washington felt "the Uncovered disc almost sounds like a marriage seminar as Lattimore and Moore share personal insight on the ups and downs of relationships, while Covered shares heartfelt praise and devotion of God's undeserved favor toward everyone." She remarked that "while Uncovered/Covered contains many familiar soulful duets, the couple's sincerity casts aside doubts that the project is merely a studio invention."

Commercial performance 
Uncovered/Covered debuted and peaked at number 95 on the US Billboard 200 chart on the issue date October 28, 2006. It fell to number 176 the following week, spending a total of 2 weeks on the chart. On the Top R&B/Hip-Hop Albums chart, the album appeared for a total of 11 weeks, peaking at number 10 in its first. On the Top Gospel Albums chart, Uncovered/Covered peaked at number 2 in its first week, remaining in the top 10 for 4 weeks and appearing for a total of 29 weeks on the chart. Billboard ranked it 41st on the 2006 US Top Gospel Albums year-end chart.

Track listing
Credits adapted from the liner notes of Uncovered/Covered.

Charts

Weekly charts

Year-end charts

References

External links
 

2006 albums
Kenny Lattimore albums
Chanté Moore albums
Covers albums